The Japanese rat snake (Elaphe climacophora) is a medium-sized colubrid snake found throughout the Japanese archipelago (except the far South West) as well as on the Russian-administered Kunashir Island. In Japanese it is known as the aodaishō or "blue general".  It is non-venomous. It is hunted by eagles and tanukis.

The snakes hibernate for three to four months, mate in spring and lay 7–20 eggs in early summer.

Description

Adults reach one to two meters in length and about five centimeters in girth. E. climacophora is the largest Japanese snake outside Okinawa. They are variable in color, ranging from pale yellow-green to dark blue-green.

Juveniles have brown-stripe pattern that may be mimesis of the venomous mamushi. An albino form is known, with specimens especially numerous near Iwakuni, where they are called "Iwakuni white snakes" and revered as messengers of deities and deity-guardians of mountains and rivers. The albino population was protected in 1924 as a "national monument."

Feeding
Japanese rat snakes eat a variety of small animals: rodents, frogs or lizards. They are good at climbing and often raid bird nests. They were favoured by farmers as effective rat control, though unpopular with chicken rearers.

Hybrids
In the German reptile zoo Exotarium Oberhof Elaphe climacophora mated with Elaphe schrenckii to produce fertile hybrids. Offspring look very much like Elaphe taeniura.

References

Ratsnakes.com

Elaphe
Snakes of Asia
Reptiles of Japan
Reptiles of Russia
Reptiles described in 1826
Taxa named by Heinrich Boie